Berseba (Nama: ǃAutsawises) is a village in the ǁKaras Region of southern Namibia and the district capital of the Berseba electoral constituency.

History
The first people to permanently settle at this place, then known under its Khoikhoi name ǃAutsawises, were a group of Orlam herder clans from the Cape Province, driven across the Orange River by encroaching European settlers and the law enforcement of the Dutch East India Company. They arrived in the area of Berseba in 1812. In 1850 their patriarch Paul Goliath established himself as independent leader of this community that subsequently became known as the "Berseba Orlam" (Nama: ǀHai-ǀkhaua).

The foundation of Berseba is recorded on 17 October 1850 when Rhenish Missionary Samuel Hahn founded the missionary station and gave it a biblically inspired name. In 1857 a church was built.

People

Since the establishment of the chieftainship of the Berseba Orlam it been held by the Goliath and Isaak clans who often were in dispute about the succession. In the 1960s the two clans split over the leadership issue and only reunited in April 2010. , Kaptein Johannes Isaak is the traditional leader of the ǀHai-ǀkhaua.

Development and Infrastructure
The first diamond in Namibia was found in this area in 1898, and oil explorations were conducted in 1900 and 1929, though neither led to substantial industrial development. The settlement is riddled with poverty, substance abuse, and crime. It features a secondary school, the Ecumenical Community School, which was in 2010 declared "unfit to serve as an educational institution" and has since been abandoned.

Berseba is connected by road to Tses (MR98), Bethanie (D3901 and D3905), Asab (D3903), Helmeringhausen (D554) and Keetmanshoop (D531), as well as to the Brukkaros tourist site (D3904).

Politics
Berseba is governed by a village council that has five seats. In the 2010 local authority election it was one of a few local authorities in Namibia where an opposition party obtained more votes for the village council than SWAPO when the Democratic Turnhalle Alliance (DTA) defeated SWAPO 221 votes to 200. No other party participated in the election for the Berseba Village Council. The 2015 local authority election was narrowly won by SWAPO party which gained three seats (266 votes). The DTA finished second and gained the remaining two seats (200 votes).

In the 2020 local authority election the Landless People's Movement (LPM, a new party registered in 2018) won with 278 votes and gained two seats. SWAPO was the runner-up with 211 votes and also two sets. The remaining council seat went to the  Popular Democratic Movement (PDM, the new name of the DTA since 2017) with 104 votes.

References

Villages in Namibia
Populated places in the ǁKaras Region
1850 establishments in South West Africa